The Unwritten Law is a 1985 Hong Kong trial drama film directed by written, produced and directed by Ng See-yuen and starring Andy Lau and Deanie Ip. The film was a critical and commercial success and was followed by two sequels, The Truth (1988) and The Truth Final Episode (1989). Because the film and its subsequent two sequels has displayed a touching mother and son love, Deanie Ip earned the nickname "Andy Lau's mother".

Plot
Raymond Lau (Andy Lau) grew up in an orphanage. He is an honors graduate from the University of London School of Law, specializing in criminal law, who just obtained a law license and is returning to Hong Kong for his career. Raymond's fiancée's family also has a background in law. At this time a case occurred, an over 50-year-old prostitute Lau Wai Lan (Deanie Ip) is suspected of killing the son of a dignitary rich client. No one is willing to defend her, and she wants to die. People are not optimistic that the work ethic and sense of justice is still driving. Raymond Lau took over the case.

Rookie lawyer Raymond, through Old Kwan's (Lau Siu Ming) help, searches for evidence everywhere — the truth gradually unraveling the case. He is opposed by the father of his fiancée, and the relationship with his fiancée gradually goes down. In an accident, Wai Lan saw Raymond has a pocket watch with  "bright future"  engraved on it, a gift that she gave her son many years back. She finds out Raymond was her son whom she took to Dean Maria's orphanage. Wai Lan has not abandoned Raymond: She became a dancer, anonymously cared for Raymond, and paid for his tuition and summons for the University of London School of Law. Wan Lan worried about the exposure of her identity would ruin Raymond's honor and identity; she refused to let Raymond defend her.

Raymond cannot accept that Wai Lan refused his defense. Wai Lan does not say anything but, under the persuasion of Old Kwan, Wai Lan finally agreed to let Raymond defend her. Raymond's logic clearly refutes, points out the contradiction of the allegations of witness, and the inference that the deceased is a sexual pervert. Raymond finds victims of sexual abuse — prostitutes — to testify based and looked for the victim's psychiatrist who testified. The psychiatrist, however, denied that the victim is his patient. Fortunately, one of Raymond's orphanage mates, Tang Siu Fan, who is a nurse of the clinic, agrees to testify and comes up with the medical records evidence that the victim is indeed his patient.

Prosecutor (Paul Chun) summoned Maria, the retired orphanage director, to testify in court about Wai Lan and Raymond's mother and son relationship. According to the British statutes and regulations there shall not have such kinship between lawyer and client, asking the judge to immediately revoke the litigation. However, Mary firmly denies Wai Lan and Raymond's mother and son relationship. The consent of the jury, the judge ruled that Wai Lan was harassed by her client and killed him under self-defense. At the end, Raymond still does not know that Wai Lan is his birth mother.

Cast
Andy Lau as Barrister Raymond Lau
Deanie Ip as Lau Wai Lan
Yammie Lam as Annie, Raymond Lau's girlfriend
Joann Tang as Tang Siu Fan
Lau Siu Ming as Old Kwan, Raymond's adviser
Paul Chun as Chief Public Prosecutor Yim Yat Kong
Lai Suen as Sister Yung
Staurt Ong as Tsang Wing Lim, the murdered client
Wong Wai as Barrister Law
Andy Tai
Chan Yau Hau as Boss Tsang
Joseph Lee as Lawyer Ting
Kam Biu
Chan Yuet Yue
Yau Lai Fong
Hon Lai Fan
Ng Yip Kwong
Felix Lok
Peter Macintosh as Judge
Elainor Johnson as Nun
Lung Cheuk
Cheung Sak Au as Uncle Wong
Leung Chi

Award nominations
5th Hong Kong Film Awards
Nominated: Best Screenplay (Ng See-yuen)
Nominated: Best Actress (Deanie Ip)

Box office
The film grossed HK$11,618,066 at the Hong Kong box office in its theatrical run from 26 September to 16 October 1985 in Hong Kong.

See also
Andy Lau filmography

External links

The Unwritten Law at Hong Kong Cinemagic

1985 films
1985 crime drama films
Hong Kong crime drama films
1980s Cantonese-language films
Films set in Hong Kong
Films shot in Hong Kong
1980s legal films
1980s Hong Kong films